The chestnut-winged cinclodes (Cinclodes albidiventris) is a species of bird in the family Furnariidae. It is found in Colombia, Venezuela, Ecuador, and Peru. It was formerly considered a subspecies of the bar-winged cinclodes. Its natural habitats are subtropical or tropical high-altitude shrubland and grassland.

References

chestnut-winged cinclodes
Birds of the Colombian Andes
Birds of the Venezuelan Andes
Birds of the Ecuadorian Andes
chestnut-winged cinclodes
chestnut-winged cinclodes